Rhynchactis macrothrix is a species of whipnose angler found in the Atlantic and western Indian Oceans where it is found at depths of around .  This species grows to a length of  SL.

References
 

Lophiiformes
Taxa named by Theodore Wells Pietsch III
Fish described in 1998
Taxa named by Erik Bertelsen